FC Kotayk is a defunct Armenian football club from the town of Abovyan, Kotayk Province.

History
Founded in 1955, Kotayk was one of the oldest football clubs in Armenia. After playing several years in the Armenian SSR League as well as the Soviet First League, Kotayk made their debut in the Armenian Premier League in 1992.

They participated in the European Cups for the first time in 1996–97. In the UEFA Cup Winners' Cup winning 1–0 at home against AEK Larnaca from Cyprus. After losing the 2nd leg away from home with a result of 0–5, they were eliminated.

However, the club was dissolved in 2005 due to both financial and non-financial shortcomings.

In June 2016, many Armenian football websites announced that the club will return to professional football with the assistance of many contributors from the Kotayk Province, under the management of Samvel Petrosyan. After playing few games in the Armenian First League, the club was forced to leave the competition due to financial difficulties.

League record

Honours
SSR Armenia League: 4
 1967, 1973, 1975, 1976

Kotayk in European cups
As of July, 2009.

Home results are noted in bold

References

 
Association football clubs established in 1955
Association football clubs disestablished in 2005
Kotayk
1955 establishments in Armenia
2005 disestablishments in Armenia